Charles Skeffington Clements (1807 – 29 September 1877) was an Irish Whig politician.

Clements was the third son of Nathaniel Clements, 2nd Earl of Leitrim—one of the first two MPs to sit for Leitrim after the Acts of Union 1801—and Mary Bermingham, daughter of William Bermingham and Mary née Ruttledge. A captain in the army, he died unmarried in 1877.

Clements was elected Whig MP for Leitrim at the 1847 general election and held the seat until 1852 when he was unseated, finishing third and bottom in the poll.

References

External links
 

1806 births
1877 deaths
Whig (British political party) MPs for Irish constituencies
Members of the Parliament of the United Kingdom for County Leitrim constituencies (1801–1922)
85th Regiment of Foot (Bucks Volunteers) officers
People from County Leitrim
UK MPs 1847–1852
Younger sons of earls
37th Regiment of Foot officers
35th Regiment of Foot officers